Yahoo Axis was a desktop web browser extension and mobile browser for iOS devices created and developed by Yahoo.

History 
The browser made its public debut on May 23, 2012.

A copy of the private key used to sign official Yahoo browser extensions for Google Chrome was accidentally leaked in the first public release of the Chrome extension.

On June 28, 2013, Yahoo announced the discontinuation of the Axis.

Design 
Axis replaces the standard search results page in other browsers with a menu of search results appearing as thumbnails at the top of the page. The menu allows the user to stay on the current page without navigating away from it.

Supported devices

Mobile browser
 Apple iPad
 Apple iPhone

Desktop browser extension 
 Google Chrome (all versions)
 Mozilla Firefox (version 7 and higher)
 Internet Explorer (version 9 and higher)
 Apple Safari (version 5 and higher)

See also 
 Yahoo Toolbar
 Google Toolbar
 Bing Bar

References 

Internet Explorer add-ons
Free Firefox legacy extensions
Google Chrome extensions
iOS web browsers
Axis